The William A. Short House is a historic house at 317 Biscoe Street in Helena, Arkansas.  It is a -story wood-frame structure, built in 1904 for William A. and Sally Baker Short.  Short was a cotton merchant with offices throughout the region, but lost much of his fortune when the cotton market collapsed and was forced to sell the house in 1917.  The house has elaborate Colonial Revival styling, most prominent on the exterior in the semicircular porch extending across its front.  Detailed woodwork in a variety of woods is found inside.

The house was listed on the National Register of Historic Places in 1985.  It is now the Edwardian Inn, a bed and breakfast accommodation.

See also
National Register of Historic Places listings in Phillips County, Arkansas

References

External links
Edwardian Inn website

Houses on the National Register of Historic Places in Arkansas
Colonial Revival architecture in Arkansas
Houses completed in 1904
Houses in Phillips County, Arkansas
National Register of Historic Places in Phillips County, Arkansas